Webster Groves High School is a public secondary school in Webster Groves, Missouri, United States. It is located at 100 Selma Ave, Webster Groves, MO. The school is part of the Webster Groves School District and its current principal is Matt Irvin.

History

Webster Groves High School was first established in 1889 as a ninth grade course. The original high school building was located on Gray Avenue, which was later repurposed as Bristol Elementary School. In 1906, a new building for the school was built at its current location, 100 Selma Avenue. James Hixson served as principal from 1907 to 1943. At first the high school was a two-story brick building with three classrooms and an auditorium. In 1913 two wings were added to the school, which contained an auditorium and a gymnasium. In 1917 an Armory was erected, but it was converted to the gymnasium/lunch room after World War I. In 1946 that building was replaced by Roberts Gym, named after Charles A. Roberts, who coached and taught at the school for 39 years.

In the 1920s a three-story section and public library were added. In 1935 an addition was completed that added the drama, home economics, and science department classrooms.

Howard Latta was principal from 1943 to 1968. WGHS was racially integrated in 1956, and in 1966 a three-story wing was added onto the back of the building and the Herbert Schooling Library was donated. Jerry Knight was principal from 1969 to 1986.

Patricia Voss was principal 1994–2003. Since 1977, Voss had been an assistant principal at the high school. In October 2002 a white powdery substance found in a tissue box provoked a two-hour lockdown. Investigators later determined the substance was not Anthrax. The Webster Groves School Board appointed Jon Clark as principal in 2003. Clark had been an assistant principal at the high school for seven years.

In 2011, construction began on a 106,000-square-foot addition to the school. Completed in 2012, this addition included new classrooms, state-of-the-art science labs, vocational labs, a main band room, private band practice rooms and art studios. The roof of the building also features a vegetation area surrounded by a glass curtain wall. In addition, three 20,000 gallon water harvesting tanks are located at the base of the building for rain collection and irrigation for the field behind the building. The expansion was built to resemble the look of the existing building, including the use of terrazzo floors and steps, and limestone accents.

Facilities
The Webster Groves High School building has 84 classrooms along with an auditorium, a media center, and a theater. It has a soccer field to the west and a baseball and softball field to the east. Moss Field, the football stadium, is located at Hixon Middle School at 630 South Elm Avenue, a short drive from the high school. The field was built in 1946 and has been renovated several times. It now has locker rooms, bleachers, lights and an all-weather track.

Curriculum

24 credits are required to graduate from Webster Groves High School. The class of 2010 and every class thereafter need four credits of Communication Skills; three credits each of Science, Math, and Social Studies; one Fine Art credit; one and a half credits each of Practical Arts and Physical Education; and six and a half Elective Credits. Students are also required to take a half credit of Personal Finance, which is considered either a practical art or a social studies credit.

Activities and clubs

 

Students may organize their own clubs as long as they are accompanied by a faculty sponsor and chartered by the student council.

Sports

Webster Groves High School sponsors a number of different sports, including football (men's), field hockey, soccer (men's and women's), basketball (men's and women's), baseball (men's), softball (women's), golf (men's and women's), track and field (men's and women's), swimming (men's and women's), and lacrosse (women's). Ice hockey and men's lacrosse are non-affiliate sports at the high school.

The Turkey Day football game is an annual game held on Thanksgiving Day between Webster Groves High School and its longtime rival, Kirkwood High School. The rivalry between the two schools is the oldest current Thanksgiving Day rivalry west of the Mississippi River. The location of the game alternates each year between Webster’s Moss Field and Kirkwood’s Lyon’s Memorial field. A number of festivities surround the game, including a shared dance and a separate bonfire and pep rally at each school. 2007 was the 100th year of this storied series between the two schools, and the game had attendance exceeding 12,000 fans.

State championship wins

1931: Boys Track
1947: Boys Golf
1951: Boys Golf
1954: Boys Golf
1954: Football
1967: Boys Swimming
1968: Boys Swimming
1970: Boys Swimming
1979: Football
1983: Girls Golf
1984: Girls Golf
1988: Football
1996: Boys Basketball
2002: Football
2008: Boys Basketball; Ranked 18th in the Nation
2009: Football; Ranked 7th in the Midwest/Midlands Region
2014: Boys Soccer; first ever in school history
2015: Boys Soccer; first public school to win twice in a row
2017: Boys Basketball
2017: Girls Soccer; first ever in school history
2018: Boys Basketball
2020: Softball
2022: Boys Basketball
2022: Boys Golf
2022: Boys Soccer

Media references
In 1966 CBS produced an award winning documentary called 16 In Webster Groves, which was about the lives of students in Webster Groves.
In 1996 then-President Bill Clinton came to the school to recognize the Webster Groves School District’s work towards preventing drugs and violence among its students.
In 1999 Time magazine devoted a cover story to a week at Webster Groves High School.

Faculty
Average professional experience: 15.3 years.
Percentage of teachers with advanced degrees: 79.4%.

School information
Grades: 9-12
Enrollment: 1,378
Senior class of 2018: 339
Student/teacher Ratio: 19:1
Rate of Attendance: 93.6%
Graduation Rate: 97.9%
2008 Composite ACT Score: 23.4
2014 National Merit Semifinalist Students: 4
2014 National Merit Commended Students: 4
Courses offering College Credit: 23

Webster Groves High School is a closed campus for grades 9-11. Juniors and Seniors are given the privilege to leave campus during their lunch hour, with Juniors being given said privilege more recently.

Notable alumni

 Bud Byerly, former Major League Baseball player, (St. Louis Cardinals)
 Harry Caray, former Major League Baseball broadcaster, (St. Louis Cardinals, St. Louis Browns, Oakland Athletics, Chicago White Sox, Chicago Cubs)
 Skip Caray, former Major League Baseball broadcaster, (Atlanta Braves)
 Adrian Clayborn, National Football League player, (Tampa Bay Buccaneers, Atlanta Falcons, New England Patriots, Cleveland Browns)
 Ivory Crockett, former sprinter
 Bob Dotson, TV journalist (NBC)
 Steve Ewing, lead singer of The Urge
 Peter Fairbanks, MLB player (Texas Rangers, Tampa Bay Rays)
 Jonathan Franzen, author
 Kimberly Gardner, Circuit Attorney for the City of St. Louis
 Charlie James, former MLB player (St. Louis Cardinals, Cincinnati Reds)
 Karlie Kloss, supermodel; class of 2011
 Jim Krebs, former NBA player (Los Angeles Lakers)
 Scott Mayfield, hockey player, 34th overall selection by New York Islanders in 2011 NHL Entry Draft
 Russ Mitchell, journalist, former CBS News anchor and current WKYC lead anchor
 Bob Sadowski, former MLB player (St. Louis Cardinals, Philadelphia Phillies, Chicago White Sox, Los Angeles)
 Tommy Turner, Olympic sprinter

References
Citations

Sources

External links

Educational institutions established in 1906
High schools in St. Louis County, Missouri
Public high schools in Missouri
1906 establishments in Missouri
Buildings and structures in St. Louis County, Missouri